North Dakota Highway 256 (ND 256) is a  east–west state highway in the U.S. state of North Dakota. ND 256's southern terminus is at U.S. Route 83 (US 83) east of Mohall, and the northern terminus is a continuation as Manitoba Provincial Road 256 (PR 256) at the Lyleton Port of Entry at the Manitoba border.

Major intersections

References

256
Transportation in Bottineau County, North Dakota